A by-election was held for the New South Wales Legislative Assembly seat of Drummoyne on 22 January 1916. It was triggered by the death of sitting George Richards.

Dates

Results 

A second ballot was necessary because Alexander Graff failed, by 176 votes, to win an absolute majority. The Sydney Morning Herald attributed the lack of majority to Frank Farnell splitting the Liberal vote.

    

George Richards  died.

See also
Electoral results for the district of Drummoyne
List of New South Wales state by-elections

References 

1916 elections in Australia
New South Wales state by-elections
1910s in New South Wales